Nicole Pratt was the defending champion, but decided not to participate that year.

Sania Mirza won in the final, defeating Alona Bondarenko 6–4, 5–7, 6–3 to become the first ever Indian woman to win a WTA singles title.

Seeds

Draw

Finals

Top half

Bottom half

References
 Draws
 Results

Hyderabad Open - Singles
Bangalore Open